The Mambo Kings Play Songs of Love is a 1989 novel by Oscar Hijuelos.

It is about the lives of two Cuban brothers and musicians, Cesar and Nestor Castillo, who immigrate to the United States and settle in New York City in the early 1950s.

The novel won the Pulitzer Prize for Fiction in 1990, being the first novel by a United States-born Hispanic to do so. It was the basis for a 1992 motion picture, The Mambo Kings, as well as a musical in 2005.

The Mambo Kings Play Songs of Love was published in 1989, and soon became a huge international bestseller. It tells the story of Cesar Castillo, an aged musician who once had a small amount of fame when he and his brother appeared on an episode of I Love Lucy in the 1950s. The book chronicles Cesar’s last hours as he sits in a seedy hotel room, drinking and listening to recordings made by his band, the Mambo Kings.

Events and characters whirl through Cesar's mind, evoking what he has lost over the years: his brother and collaborator, Nestor, who spent his adult life constantly rewriting one song about a lost love; the many lovers who gave themselves up to him as he rose triumphantly through the mambo music craze of the early 1950s; and the way of life that disappeared for all Cubans after that country was overthrown by an insurrection led by Fidel Castro in 1959.  After coming to the US, Cesar's memories include events in the lives of his and Nestor's girlfriends, wives, and children.  In telling Cesar’s story, Hijuelos weaves in cameo appearances by several real-life mambo musicians, including Desi Arnaz, Tito Puente, Pérez Prado, Machito and Mongo Santamaría.

The novel develops one of Hijuelos' most common themes: how immigrants adjust to coming to the United States and how they see themselves in relation to their new culture in contrast to the culture of their birth.  Also, the book showcases Hijuelos' distinctive, richly detailed description of his characters' lives written in a prose-style that evokes the rhythms of Cuban music.

References

External links
 Dancing into the Dream: Review at the NYTimes.
 Photos of the first edition of The Mambo Kings Play Songs of Love

1990 American novels
Pulitzer Prize for Fiction-winning works
Hispanic and Latino American novels
Novels set in New York City
Novels set in Cuba
Fiction set in the 1950s
Novels about music
Mambo
Farrar, Straus and Giroux books
American novels adapted into films